Arklow Pottery was a pottery founded in 1934 and formally opened by Seán Lemass (Minister for Industry and Commerce) 29 July 1935 in South Quay, Arklow, County Wicklow, Ireland. The company produced many decorative earthenware goods and general table crockery.

History
Arklow Pottery ran into financial difficulties in the 1970s and was taken over by Japanese tableware company Noritake in 1977. After losses of more than £7.5 million over a 20-year period, the company ceased production in 1998. At its peak the company had employed 480 people.

There is an Arklow Pottery cup and saucer with Tiger stripes, designed by John French around 1950, held and exhibited by the National Museum of Ireland. Arklow pottery is now closed.

Gallery

References

Ceramics manufacturers of Ireland